Studia mythologica Slavica is a Slovene academic journal dedicated to ethnology, history, archaeology, linguistics, religious studies, literary history and philosophy in the context of Slavic mythology. Published since 1998 by the Institute of Slovenian Ethnology (Scientific Research Centre of the Slovenian Academy of Science and Arts (ZRC SAZU)) and the University of Udine. The journal is a annual published in print and online. Articles are published in all Slavic languages, in English, German and Italian. The main goal of the journal is to present comparative research that presents Slavic culture in the broader context of European and non-European cultures. The journal also encourages the study of contemporary phenomena of spiritual, social and material culture and their transformations.

Editorial Team 

 Editors-in-Chief

 dr. Monika Kropej Telban (ZRC SAZU, Institute of Slovenian Ethnology)
 dr. Katja Hrobat Virloget (University of Primorska, Faculty of Humanities)

 Editors

 dr. Roberto Dapit (University of Udine, Department of Languages and Literatures, Communication, Education and Society, Italy)

 Review Editor

 dr. Saša Babič (ZRC SAZU)

 Advisory Board

 Natka Badurina (University of Udine, Italy)
 Nikos Chausidis (Ss. Cyril and Methodius University of Skopje, North Macedonia)
 Pietro U. Dini (University of Pisa, Italy)
 Larisa Fialkova (University of Haifa, Israel)
 Mare Kõiva (Estonian Literary Museum, Estonia)
 Janina Kursīte (Riga Stradiņš University, Latvia)
 Nijolė Laurinkienė (Institute of Lithuanian Literature and Folklore, Lithuania)
 Mirjam Mencej (University of Ljubljana, Slovenia)
 Vladimir Nartnik (ZRC SAZU, Slovenia)
 Andrej Pleterski (ZRC SAZU, Slovenia)
 Ljubinko Radenković (SANU, Serbia)
 Svetlana Tolstaya (Institute for Slavic Studies of the Russian Academy of Sciences, Russia)
 Giorgio Ziffer (University of Udine, Italy)

Studia mythologica Slavica – Supplementa 
Since 2004, the journal also publishes a series of books Studia mythologica Slavica - Supplementa, intended for monographs.

References

See also 
 List of academic journals published in Slovenia

Religious studies journals
Slovenian Academy of Sciences and Arts
Academic journals of Slovenia